Elizabeth (Betsy) Cavendish is the president of the Appleseed Foundation, a position she began in March 2007, a year after serving as interim president of NARAL Pro-Choice America, an American pro-choice advocacy group. She gained the position in May 2004 following the resignation of longtime NARAL president Kate Michelman. Previously, she served as NARAL's legal director and on the staff of the Office of Legal Counsel in the Justice Department under Attorney General Janet Reno.

Cavendish has worked in all three branches of government and in academia.  She spent several years at the U.S. Department of Justice and was an assistant professor of law at the University of Illinois College of Law. Cavendish was a law clerk for Judge Gerhard Gesell on the U.S. District Court for the District of Columbia on United States v. Oliver North. She is a graduate of Yale University and Yale Law School.

References

American lawyers
American abortion-rights activists
Living people
Yale Law School alumni
Year of birth missing (living people)
21st-century American women lawyers
21st-century American lawyers